Orazio Samacchini (20 December 1532 – 12 June 1577) was an Italian painter of the late-Renaissance and Mannerist style, active in Rome, Parma, and his native city.

Biography
He was born and died in Bologna. A close friend of Lorenzo Sabbatini, Samacchini traveled to Rome where he participated in 1563 in the decoration of the Vatican Belvedere and of the Sala Regia of Pius IV, along with Taddeo Zuccari and his brother. He returned to Bologna, where he was influenced by Pellegrino Tibaldi. Sammacchini painted for the Palazzo Vitelli a Sant'Egidio, Città di Castello, San Giacomo Maggiore, the church of Corpus Domini in Bologna, and Santa Maria Maggiore (Santa Maria Della Vita?) in Bologna. He painted frescoes of Virtues, Prophets, and Angels in Sant'Abbondio, Cremona.

Instructions for how to paint (1570) in the Cathedral of Parma are collected in Gualandi's Memorie.

References

External links
    
Web Gallery of Art
 Grove encyclopedia on Artnet

1532 births
1577 deaths
Painters from Bologna
16th-century Italian painters
Italian male painters
Italian Mannerist painters